is a Japanese long-distance runner who specializes in the marathon race.

She was the 2002 winner of the Kagawa Marugame Half Marathon, taking the title in 1:09:33. She ran at the 2010 London Marathon and finished in ninth place with a time of 2:25:43.

Competition record

Personal bests
5000 metres - 15:12.76 min (2003)
10,000 metres - 31:34.15 min (2005)
Half marathon - 1:09:33 hrs (2002)
Marathon - 2:23:30 hrs (2003)

References

External links
 

1975 births
Living people
People from Hirakata
Japanese female long-distance runners
Japanese female marathon runners
World Athletics Championships athletes for Japan
Japan Championships in Athletics winners
20th-century Japanese women
21st-century Japanese women